O31 may refer to:
 Douglas O-31, an observation aircraft of the United States Army Air Corps
 Healdsburg Municipal Airport, in Sonoma County, California, United States
 Otoyol 31, a motorway in Turkey